The Guardian Angels Church is a Roman Catholic church at 377 Mile End Road in Mile End, east London. Designed by Frederick Arthur Walters, it was opened in 1903 and paid for by Henry Fitzalan-Howard, 15th Duke of Norfolk as a memorial to his youngest sister, Lady Margaret Howard, who had performed charitable work in the East End.

The church and its presbytery are both grade II listed buildings.

References

External links

Churches completed in 1903
Frederick Walters buildings
Grade II listed churches in London
Roman Catholic churches in the London Borough of Tower Hamlets
Mile End